Enarthrocarpus is a genus of flowering plants belonging to the family Brassicaceae.

Its native range is Bulgaria to Arabian Peninsula.

Species:

Enarthrocarpus arcuatus 
Enarthrocarpus clavatus 
Enarthrocarpus lyratus 
Enarthrocarpus pterocarpus 
Enarthrocarpus strangulatus

References

Brassicaceae
Brassicaceae genera